The Orthodox Cemetery in Warsaw is an historic Eastern Orthodox cemetery located in the Wola district of Warsaw, Poland.

History
In 1834 the first Orthodox parish was established in Warsaw and a decision was made to set up a cemetery for the community. The Roman Catholic parish of St. Lawrence was then turned into an Orthodox church, by decree of the Tsar himself. Although the cemetery was officially consecrated in 1841, the first burials took place there as early as 1836. In 1905 a new church, St. John the Ladder was built, while St. Lawrence Church returned to the Roman Catholic church after Poland regained its independence.

Customs
The burial place of a person depended on his/her social status. Thus, generals, clergy and notable civil servants were buried near the church. The second 'zone' included the graves of lower rank officers, clerks and wealthy merchants. The third 'zone' housed the graves of soldiers and members of the bourgeoisie, while the poorest were buried in the area furthest from the church. During the Warsaw Uprising mass executions of Varsovians were carried out there.

On All Saint's Day, processions of the Orthodox and Roman Catholic churches take place there, preceded by an ecumenical service conducted by priests from both congregations.

Notable burials
Among those buried at the cemetery are:
 Mikhail Artsybashev (1879–1927), Russian poet and writer
 Marko Bezruchko (1883–1944), Ukrainian military commander and a General of the Ukrainian National Republic
 Andrzej Butruk (1964–2011), Polish actor, satirician, singer
 Dmitry Filosofov (1872–1940), Russian author, essayist, literary critic
 Aleksander Gudzowaty (1938–2013), Polish economist and entrepreneur
 Czesław Kiszczak (1925–2015), Polish general, Interior Minister, Prime Minister
 Jerzy Klinger (1918–1975), Polish Orthodox theologian
 Siergiej Muchanow (1833–1897), Russian official, officer in the Special Corps of Gendarmes,  director of the Warsaw Theatre Directorate
 Alexander Petrov (1794–1867), Russian chess player, chess composer, and chess writer
 Aleksandr Puzyrevskii (1845–1904), Russian General of the Infantry
 Witold Smętek (1910–1983), Polish athlete (spelled as Witold Smentek)
 Sokrates Starynkiewicz (1820–1892), Mayor of Warsaw
 Jerzy Turonek (1929–2019), Polish-Belarusian historian
 metropolitan Dionizy (Waledyński) (1876–1960)
 Andrzej Walicki (1930–2020), Polish historian

Gallery

External links 

 Cmentarz prawosławny na Woli z satelity
 

Cemeteries in Warsaw
Eastern Orthodox cemeteries
Eastern Orthodoxy in Poland
Wola
1841 establishments in Poland